Silent Barricade is a 1949 Czechoslovak war film about the Prague uprising at the end of World War II directed by Otakar Vávra.

Cast
 Jaroslav Průcha as Hošek 
 Barbara Drapińska as Halina 
 Jaroslav Marvan as strážník Brůček
 Vladimír Šmeral as František Kroupa
 Marie Vášová as Nedvědová
 Robert Vrchota as Sergeant
 Jiří Plachý as Uhlíř
 Jaromír Spal as Tramway Conductor
 Jaroslav Zrotal as Tramway Driver
 Eva Karelová as Tramway Conductor
 Jaroslava Panenková as Hošková

References

External links
 

1949 films
1949 drama films
1940s war drama films
1940s Czech-language films
Czechoslovak black-and-white films
Films directed by Otakar Vávra
Czech war drama films
Czech black-and-white films
Czech resistance to Nazi occupation in film
Czechoslovak drama films
Czech World War II films
Czechoslovak World War II films
1940s Czech films